"光復節" is a term in Chinese that means "restoration" or "retrocession", and may refer to:

Gwangbokjeol in Korea
Retrocession Day in Taiwan
Restoration of Independence Day in Portugal